Stiphodon surrufus is a species of goby endemic to the Philippines where it is only known to occur in Lagu Lagu creek on Leyte Island.  It inhabits areas with boulders and swift-flowing water.  This species can reach a length of  SL.

References

surrufus
Freshwater fish of the Philippines
Taxonomy articles created by Polbot
Taxa named by Ronald E. Watson
Taxa named by Maurice Kottelat
Fish described in 1995